The Guitar Trio is a reunion album by Al Di Meola, Paco de Lucía and John McLaughlin, released in 1996 after 13 years without playing together. This 1996 effort has three originals apiece from McLaughlin and Di Meola, two by de Lucía and a McLaughlin-Di Meola duet on "Manhã de Carnaval".

Track listing
"La Estiba" (Paco de Lucía)  – 5:51
"Beyond the Mirage" (Al Di Meola)  – 6:10
"Midsummer Night" (John McLaughlin)  – 4:36
"Manhã de Carnaval" (Luiz Bonfá, Antônio Maria)  – 6:11
"Letter from India" (John McLaughlin)  – 3:54
"Espiritu" (Al Di Meola)  – 5:30
"Le Monastère dans les Montagnes" (John McLaughlin)  – 6:15
"Azzura" (Al Di Meola)  – 7:58
"Cardeosa" (Paco de Lucía)  – 6:36

Personnel 
Paco de Lucía – guitar (1-3,5,7-9) - plays a Hermanos Conde guitar
Al Di Meola – guitar (tracks 1-4,6-9), percussion (6) - plays both Ovation and a Hermanos Conde guitar-percution/hands, shaker
John McLaughlin – guitar (1-5,7-9) - uses a Wechter guitar, D'Addario strings and a Lawrence Fishman microphone

Chart performance

References

1996 albums
Al Di Meola albums
Paco de Lucía albums
John McLaughlin (musician) albums
Collaborative albums
Verve Records albums